Thailand competed at the World Games 2017 in Wroclaw, Poland, from 20 July 2017 to 30 July 2017.

Medalists

Competitors

Air Sports
Thailand qualified for the 2017 World Games:

 Paramotor Slalom
 Kittiphob Phrommat
 Chayaphong Pothipuk
 Pongkorn Thanasakunkornsaeng
 Janejira Chui-noei

Boules Sports
Thailand qualified for the 2017 World Games:

 Men's Petanque Precision Shooting 
 Thanakorn Sangkaew
 Men's Petanque Doubles
 Thanakorn Sangkaew
 Sarawut Sriboompeng

 Women's Petanque Precision Shooting 
 Nantawan Fueangsanit
 Women's Petanque Doubles
 Nantawan Fueangsanit
 Phantipha Wongchuvej

DanceSport
Thailand qualified for the 2017 World Games:

 Latin
 Puttisit Promna
 Nattanicha Ittisophonpisarn

Indoor rowing
Thailand qualified for the 2017 World Games:

 Men's Lightweight 2000m
 Jaruwat Saensuk

 Women's Lightweight 2000m
 Phuttharaksa Neegree

Ju-Jitsu
Thailand qualified for the 2017 World Games:

 Women's Duo
 Suphawadee Kaeosrasaen
 Kunsatri Kumsroi

Muaythai
Thailand qualified for the 2017 World Games:

 Men's 54kg
 Pranom Sung-ngoen
 Men's 57kg
 Wiwat Khamtha
 Men's 67kg
 Anueng Khatthamarasri
 Men's 71kg
 Suppachai Muensang

 Women's 51kg
 Apasara Koson

Sumo
Thailand qualified for the 2017 World Games:

 Men's Lightweight 
 Jakkrapong Chaorungmetee
 Men's Open Weight
 Jakkrapong Chaorungmetee

 Women's Heavyweight 
 Viparat Vituteerasan
 Women's Middleweight 
 Kamonchanok Amnuaypol
 Women's Open Weight
 Kamonchanok Amnuaypol
 Viparat Vituteerasan

References 

Nations at the 2017 World Games
2017 in Thai sport
2017